The 1976 NCAA Division I Wrestling Championships were the 46th NCAA Division I Wrestling Championships to be held. The University of Arizona in Tucson, Arizona hosted the tournament at the McKale Center.

Iowa took home the team championship with 123.25 points and three individual champions.

Chuck Yagla of Iowa was named the Most Outstanding Wrestler and Herb Calvert of Oklahoma received the Gorriaran Award.

Team results

Individual finals

References

NCAA Division I Wrestling Championship
NCAA
Wrestling competitions in the United States
NCAA Division I  Wrestling Championships
NCAA Division I  Wrestling Championships
NCAA Division I  Wrestling Championships